Bratunac is a town and municipality located in easternmost part of Bosnia and Herzegovina. As of 2013 census, it has a population of 20,340 inhabitants, while the town of Bratunac has a population of 8,359 inhabitants.

History

Early history
In 1381, the name Bratunac is mentioned for the first time because of the direct road through Bratunac from Bosnia and Herzegovina to Serbia. At the time, Bratunac was composed of five houses and a population of roughly 30 people. In 1461, the region came under Ottoman rule after it was conquered by the Ottomans under Mehmed II. Under Turkish rule, it was transformed into a kasbah that included mosques, a medrese, several mekteps, shadirvans, caravanserais, and other types of Islamic architecture. In 1927, Bratunac became a municipality for the first time. In 1912, as the Ottoman Empire fell into decline, the Serbian Army liberated the region.

Settlements
Aside from the town of Bratunac, the municipality consists of the following settlements:

 Abdulići
 Banjevići
 Biljača
 Bjelovac
 Blječeva
 Boljevići
 Brana Bačići
 Dubravice
 Fakovići
 Glogova
 Hranča
 Hrnčići
 Jagodnja
 Jaketići
 Jelah
 Ježeštica
 Joševa
 Konjevići
 Krasanovići
 Kravica
 Krke
 Lipenovići
 Loznica
 Magašići
 Mihaljevići
 Moštanice
 Mlečva
 Mratinci
 Oćenovići
 Opravdići
 Osamsko
 Pirići
 Pobrđe
 Pobuđe
 Podčauš
 Polom
 Rakovac
 Repovac
 Sikirić
 Slapašnica
 Stanatovići
 Suha
 Šiljkovići
 Svilile
 Tegare
 Urkovići
 Vitkovići
 Voljavica
 Vraneševići
 Zagoni
 Zalužje
 Zapolje
 Žlijebac

Demographics

According to Columbia-Lippincott Gazetteer, in 1948 Bratunac had a population of 5,033.

Population

Ethnic composition

Data by settlements

Economy

The following table gives a preview of total number of registered people employed in legal entities per their core activity (as of 2018):

See also
 Municipalities of Republika Srpska
 Konjević Polje
 Kravica attack
 Veljaci Bratunac

References

External links

 Official site

Populated places in Bratunac
Cities and towns in Republika Srpska